Tees Valley Regeneration was an urban regeneration company covering the Tees Valley area of North East England and at one time was the largest urban development agency in England.
The headquarters were at Cavendish House, Teesdale Business Park in Thornaby-on-Tees.

Tees Valley Regeneration started in 2002, operated for seven years under the leadership of Joe Docherty, who left the organisation in 2009, and closed in 2010; responsibility for regeneration was transferred to local councils.

Projects 

Tees Valley Regeneration's main regeneration projects were:

 Central Park in Darlington, including the new Darlington College.
 Skylink International Business Park at Durham Tees Valley Airport.
 Middlehaven in Middlesbrough, in particular the development of the new Middlesbrough College and Anish Kapoor's Temenos in Middlehaven Dock, one of the Tees Valley Giants.
 North Shore in Stockton-on-Tees, in particular the development of Infinity Bridge, expansion of Durham University's Queen's Campus and the North Shore development.
 Victoria Harbour in Hartlepool.

See also 

 Tees Valley

Other local and regional development agencies

 One NorthEast (closed 2012)
 SMi - Stockton Middlesbrough Initiative
 Teesside Development Corporation (defunct 1998).
 Middlesbrough Development Corporation

References 

Defunct public bodies of the United Kingdom
Urban Regeneration Companies
Borough of Stockton-on-Tees
Middlesbrough
Organisations based in the Borough of Hartlepool
Redcar and Cleveland
Cleveland, England
Borough of Darlington
Organisations based in North Yorkshire